Wharncliffe is an unincorporated community in Mingo County, West Virginia, United States.

The origin of the town's name is obscure. It shares its name with a village north of Sheffield in England called Wharncliffe Crags, and the associated Earls of Wharncliffe.

Wharncliffe is a junction on the Norfolk Southern Railway (former Norfolk and Western) network, where the three states of Virginia, West Virginia and Kentucky meet.

References

Unincorporated communities in Mingo County, West Virginia
Unincorporated communities in West Virginia